David Six may refer to:

David Six (musician) (born 1985), Austrian pianist, composer and multi-instrumentalist
David Six (artist) (born 1968), Canadian artist
 David Six (basketball)